Georgian Cargo Airlines Africa was a cargo airline based in Dakar, Senegal. It operated cargo services in West Africa using wet-leased aircraft as required.

History
The airline was established and started operations in 2003. In 2009, the airline ceased all operations.

Defunct airlines of Senegal
Airlines established in 2003
Airlines disestablished in 2009